The Croods: Family Tree is an American computer-animated streaming television series that is produced from DreamWorks Animation under DreamWorks Animation Television. The series is based on the 2013 animated film The Croods, taking place after the events of the 2020 film, The Croods: A New Age. The series was released on September 23, 2021, with a second season premiered April 5, 2022, and a third season premiered on June 2, 2022. A fourth season premiered on August 31, 2022. A fifth season premiered on November 25, 2022.

Plot
After the events of the sequel, the Croods and Bettermans must learn to get along in the Betterman treehouse.

Cast
 Kiff VandenHeuvel as Grug Crood and Lighting Bolt (season 4)
 Ally Dixon as Eep Crood
 Darin Brooks as Guy
 A. J. Locascio as Thunk Crood
 Amy Landecker as Ugga Crood
 Artemis Pebdani as Gran Crood
 Dee Bradley Baker as Sandy, Belt, and Sash
 Matthew Waterson as Phil Betterman
 Amy Rosoff as Hope Betterman
 Kelly Marie Tran (season 1-5) and Abby Trott (season 5) as Dawn Betterman
 TBA as Hwam (season 5)

Episodes

Series overview

Season 1 (2021)

Season 2 (2022)

Season 3 (2022)

Season 4 (2022)

Season 5 (2022)

Production
On August 31, 2021, DreamWorks announced a CGI animated series titled The Croods: Family Tree, based on The Croods: A New Age, and would stream September 23 on Hulu and Peacock. Tran reprises her role as Dawn, while A. J. Locascio reprises his role as Thunk from Dawn of the Croods. The new voice cast features Amy Landecker as Ugga, Kiff VandenHeuvel as Grug, Ally Dixon as Eep, Artemis Pebdani as Gran, Darin Brooks as Guy, Matthew Waterson as Phil, and Amy Rosoff as Hope. Mark Banker (from The Epic Tales of Captain Underpants, Adventure Time, Go, Dog, Go!) and Todd Grimes (from The Epic Tales of Captain Underpants) serve as executive producers and showrunners for the series. Like all DreamWorks Animation Television programs, the series will be animated by Mikros Animation under Technicolor Animation Productions.

References

External links
 

2020s American animated television series
2021 American television series debuts
American children's animated adventure television series
American children's animated comedy television series
American children's animated fantasy television series
American computer-animated television series
English-language television shows
Hulu original programming
Hulu children's programming
Peacock (streaming service) original programming
Peacock (streaming service) children's programming
Television series by DreamWorks Animation
Television series by Universal Television
Animated television shows based on films
Animated television series about children
Animated television series about families
Television series set in prehistory
The Croods (franchise)